G.Karthikeyan Smaraka Government Vocational and Higher Secondary School aka Government Model V HSS Vellanad is located amid of Vellanad, Thiruvananthapuram. The school started as a Lower Primary school in 1891, and from 1957 onwards, it became an Upper Primary school, and in 1962, it became the High School. In 1989, the VHSE Department started, and in 2000, the Higher Secondary Section was also launched. In 1998, the School won the PSSCIVE(Pandit Sunderlal Sharma Central Institute of Vocational Education) Award. The school also won the State Award 2002-03 for establishing the best IT lab for the IT@School project. It also received Central Government's 2nd Computer Literacy Excellence Award for School-2003. In 2004, Principal K. S Vimalakumari was rewarded for the National Teachers Award''. The school won the title 'MODEL' in the academic year 2012–2013.
The school divided into four wings, such as Upper primary, High school, Higher secondary and Vocational higher secondary.
The higher secondary wing offers courses for biology, computer science, commerce, humanities and most exclusively for journalism (under the Humanities group). Medical laboratory technician (MLT) and Livestock management (LSM) are the two courses offered in the vocational higher secondary wing.

Later, the school was renamed as G. Karthikeyan memorial.

Aneesh VN is the current PTA president.

References

Schools in Thiruvananthapuram district

https://schools.org.in/thiruvananthapuram/32140601014/govt-model-vhss-vellanad